The Chinese Ambassador to Egypt is the official representative of the People's Republic of China to the Arab Republic of Egypt.

The ambassador is also accredited to the Arab League.

List of representatives

References 

 
Egypt
China